Czechoslovak Basketball League career stats leaders are the all-time stats leaders of the now defunct top-tier level professional basketball league of Czechoslovakia, the Czechoslovak Basketball League (CSBL). Czech Basketball Federation  Hall of Fame induction in 2016, Slovak Basketball Association Hall of Fame induction in 2020.

All-time career leading scorers of the Czechoslovak Basketball League (1962–63 to 1992–93)  

The all-time top scoring leaders of the Czechoslovak Basketball League (CSBL), which was the top-tier level professional club basketball league of the former Czechoslovakia. Includes points scored between the 1962–63 season and the 1992–93 season.

See also
Czechoslovak League
Czech Player of the Year
Slovak Player of the Year
Czech All-20th Century Team

References

External links
 začátku provádění evidence - ročníku 1961/1963 do 31. 12. 1992 

Basketball in Czechoslovakia
Czech basketball players